Ali Al-Ghurairi is an Iraqi army general, commanding general, and chief of police, who currently serves as Director-General Commander of Police of the capital Baghdad. He previously served as the Chief of staff of the Iraqi Federal Police Forces Command, Director-General of Directorate of Recruitment Management in Ministry Of Defense, Director of Training in MOD, and Director of Administration in MOD.

Early life and education
Al Ghurairi graduated from the first military college in 1980 in Baghdad. He did a bachelor's in law, a master's in military service, and a Ph.D. in war studies.

Career
Al Ghurairi, during his diversified military career, handled several offices and assumed multiple positions. Initially, he was appointed as a Director-General of the Directorate of Recruitment Management in the Ministry Of Defense. After that, he was promoted to the post of Director of Training in MOD. In 2004, Ghurairi became the Director of Administration in MOD.

In 2007, Al Ghurairi was appointed by the Prime Minister Commander in Chief at the Ministry of Interior as Director-General Commander of Holy Karbala’ Governorate Police Forces where he handled several duties such as reinforcement of law, security, and order.

Later, Al Ghurairi was appointed as a Director and Commander of Customs and Border Protection of the Iraqi Southern Region Headquarters in Basra. Soon he became the Chief of Staff of Iraqi Federal Police Forces Command, then Director-General Commander of the Iraqi Federal Police Forces for a two weeks, then Presently, Al Ghurairi is Director-General Commander of Police of the capital Baghdad, Iraq.

Al Ghurairi was also a Member of the Iraqi National Reconciliation Committee back in 2007.

Awards
Al Ghurairi has received many certificates of appreciation as well as several medals of courage and medals of high merit in his career as a Commander.

References

External links

Iraqi Ground Forces personnel
1959 births
Living people
Iraqi generals
Iraqi military leaders
Iraqi military personnel
Iraqi soldiers
War in Iraq (2013–2017)